Ian Rogers (9 July 1957 – 26 November 1998) was an international rugby union referee from South Africa. Before becoming a full-time referee, Rogers attended Maritzburg College – the same high school as fellow international rugby referee Craig Joubert. As one of South Africa's foremost referees of his time, Rogers represented his country as referee at the 1995 Rugby World Cup.

Test Match Honour Roll
Rogers refereed a total of 10 international test matches during his career from 1993 to 1998. He is the 8th-most capped international rugby referee from South Africa, along with Freek Burger and Louis Mzomba.

Amongst other games, Rogers was referee in the following:

Test history

The British & Irish Lions
Rogers was the referee for the match between the Junior Springboks & The British & Irish Lions at the Boland Stadium on 17 June 1997.

Recognition
In recognition of Rogers' achievements in rugby refereeing, his alma mater now awards the "Ian Rogers Trophy for the Most Competent Rugby Referee".

References

External links
Photo of Ian Rogers

1957 births
1998 deaths
South African rugby union referees
Rugby World Cup referees
Alumni of Maritzburg College